"Malhar" is a Hindustani classical raga. Malhar is associated with torrential rains. 

Besides the basic Shuddha Malhar, which was the original Malhar, several Malhar-related ragas use the Malhar signature phrase m (m)R (m)R P, including "Miyan ki Malhar", "Megh Malhar", "Ramdasi Malhar", "Gaud Malhar", "Sur Malhar", "Shuddha Malhar", "Desh Malhar", "Nat Malhar", "Dhulia Malhar", and "Meera ki Malhar". This phrase, although it might seem similar and equivalent, is different from the swara phraseology employed in Raga "Brindavani Sarang". 

It can be determined that raga Malhar or rather Miyan ki Malhar is a mixture of ragas "Brindavani Sarang", raga "Kafi" and raga "Durga".This raga has a Vakra form (meaning that the swaras of a raga are not completely arranged in a particularly straightforward manner), and is classified as a Ghambir Prakruti raga (meaning that it is played slow with patience, and it is played in a serious tone/note).

Legend 
According to legend, Malhar is so powerful that when sung, it can induce rainfall.

Many written accounts describe the Raga Malhar. Tansen, Baiju Bawra, Baba Ramdas, Nayak Charju, Miyan Bakhshu, Tanta rang, Tantras Khan, Bilas Khan (son of Tansen), Hammer Sen, Surat Sen, and Meera Bai are some of those said to be capable of starting rains using various kinds of Raga Malhar.

Mughal emperor Akbar once asked his court musician Miyan Tansen to sing "Raga Deepak", the raga of Light/Fire, which caused all the lamps in the courtyard to light up and Tansen's body to become so hot that he had to sit in the nearby river to cool himself. However, the river began to boil, and it became apparent that Tansen would soon boil to death. So he set out to find someone who could sing Raga Malhar to cure him. In due course, he reached Vadnagar, a town in Gujarat. There he came across two sisters named Tana and Riri, whom he asked for help, to which they agreed. The moment they started singing the Raga Malhar, rains came down in torrents, which helped cool Tansen's body.

The many variations of Raga Malhar have been categorised chronologically by era – prachina (before the 15th century), madhyakalina (15th – 18th century) and arvachina (19th century and beyond). Ragas Shuddha Malhar, Megh Malhar and Gaud Malhar belong to the first period. 
"Miyan Ki Malhar", also known as Gayand Malahar as both nishads (shudh and komal) swing around the dhaivat like a (gayand) elephant swinging his head.

Prominent Bandishes composed in Raga Malhar

In popular culture 
In Bankim Chandra Chatterjee's Bengali language novel Anandamath (1882), a band of yogis sing Vande mataram in Raga Desh.

In Satyajit Ray's film Jalsaghar, Raga Malhar is used to link the powers of nature and the hero's internal conflict.

The song Thumbi Thullal from the movie Cobra is based on this raag. It is composed by A. R. Rahman and sung by Shreya Ghoshal & Nakul Abhyankar.

Historical information 
There is a legend stating that Tansen's physical agony after singing Raga Deepak (Poorvi Thaat) was pacified with listening to Raga "Megh Malhar" rendered by Tana and Riri.

Film songs

Tamil

Also see
 Malhar (family of ragas)

References 

Hindustani ragas
Ragas in the Guru Granth Sahib